Lucina Bragg Adams (1870 – 1932) was an American composer, writer, and editor from Petersburg, Virginia.

Early life and education 
Lucinda Bragg Adams was born in 1870 in Old Dominion, near Petersburg, Virginia, the daughter of George and Mary Bragg. She attended the Colored Schools of Petersburg. Adams' family were close friends of John Mercer Langston, the first African-American Congressman, and Adams later dedicated her book Old Blanford Church to him. Adams brother George Freeman Bragg was the publisher of the Afro-American Churchman and the Church Advocate.

Career 
Adams was noted for her musical talent at a young age, and her musical compositions were circulated widely in Virginia. In addition to being a noted musician, Adams was an accomplished journalist, and she wrote for widely circulated publications such as the A.M.E. Church Review, this resulted in increase attention to her pieces, such as "Old Blandford Church", a piece dedicated to John Mercer Langston. Amelia Tilghman chose Adams to be her assistant editor at The Musical Messenger, the first African-American music journal.

References 

1870 births
1932 deaths
African-American composers
African-American women composers
American women composers
African-American women writers
American magazine editors
Women magazine editors
African-American women musicians
20th-century African-American people
20th-century African-American women